Mahakavi Dasu Sriramulu (1846 - 1908) was a scholar composer, poet, Avadhani (Avadhāni refers to the individual who performs the Avadhānaṃ; one of the many individuals asking questions is a Pṛcchaka the questioner) orator, author of 33 books, proficient in astrology and dramaturgy, translator, founder of a music school, nationalist and social reformer. He was a lawyer by profession. He was a child prodigy.  He had no formal tutelage in these diverse arts – his knowledge was gained through his personal studies and association with scholars and artists.

Early life and Education 
He was born on 8 April 1846 in  Kuraada village,  Krishna District, Madras Presidency (presently the Andhra Pradesh state), India.  Sriramulu's parents were Kannaiah and Kamamma. He had early education in Sanskrit, Telugu, Vyakarana (grammar) and Scriptures in the traditional manner.  He mastered these arts from his close association with exponents in these arts and by natural instinct rather than by formal percept under a guru.  In his tenth year he studied Telugu, Sanskrit classical literature and Hindu Astronomy, by his twentieth year attained proficiency in these subjects and after another six years secured a teacher’s place.  Later he began his English education and qualified for setting up his law practice  as 'first grade pleader'. He continued in the profession until 1895. He passed away in his sixty-second year in his own house at Elure (Andhra Pradesh) state.

Literary Activity 
He dominated the literary world in later half of the 19th century. The encyclopaedias of Telugu literature devoted a chapter to Dasu Sriramulu. He devoted himself to the authorship of a number of useful works for the edification of the public on literary, social and miscellaneous subjects. His miscellaneous works in Arithmetic, science of expression and Logic written in Telugu will amply repay perusal. He was a fluent speaker and traveled extensively in the Northern Circars and the Nizam’s Dominions for several years, delivering lectures on diverse subjects. He began writing so early in his 12th year and wrote  many books in Sanskrit and Telugu. In 1902 his master pieces of literary works both the languages - Andhra Devl Bhagavatam, and Sakuntalam were written He wrote Somalingeswara satakam when he was only 12 years old and Satrajiti Vilasam, a yakshaganam at the age of14 years.Later he wrote kavyalu, Satakas (100 verses), plays, lyrics for musical and dance compositions such as - Krutulu, Javalis, Padams, yakshaganam in Telugu. He translated many satakams and plays from Sanskrit into Telugu.

Musical Compositions 
He has around 80 musical compositions with mudra: Dasu Rama to his credit.  By the end of 1887 Sriramulu completed 2 volumes of keertanas, swarajitis, tillanas, padams and javalees (different forms of Carnatic music). His keertanas generally had a pallavi (the initial portion of musical composition) and three charanas (stanzas) written in the praise of Vinayaka, Saraswati, Krishna, Rama, Jagadamba and Lakshmi. Sriramulu Padams were dedicated to Thotlavalluru Venugopalaswami. His mudra was "Dasu Rama". The notation was provided by Voleti, Nallanchakravarthula Krishnamacharyulu, and Nookala Chinna Satyanarayana. His musical works were sung by  Dwaram Venkataswamy Naidu, Sripada Pinakapani, Voleti Venkataswarulu, Srirangam Gopalaratnam, etc. Pinakapani mentioned that "the grammar of his padams and javalis was perfect. He was among the finest composers in this genre. "Hyderabad brothers (Sri D. Raghavachari, and Sri D. Seshachari), Malladi Brothers, Malladi Suribabu, Voleti Venkateswerlu,  Sriramgam Gopalaratnam etc. rendered his compositions in public concerts, at All India Radio national level programs, television. His compositions were sung by musician Y. Ramaprabha and brought out as CD under the title 'Dasu Sreerama Ganasudha'.

Dance Compositions  
The poet, composer Dasu Sriramulu's association with traditional dancers, their patrons (kings, landlords) and devadasis (temple dancers resulted in his treatise Abhinaya Darpanam, padams and javalis.  Kuchipudi gurus, and choreographers consulted Sriramulu for their dance performances. Temple dancers performed his compositions and paid public tribute to him. Kuchipudi expert Vedantam Ramalinga Sastry reveals: "Kuchipudi gurus like Bhagavathula Vissaiah were enriched by his inputs."  There was a dance programme on his compositions choreographed by Swapnasundari, which was performed by her disciples.

Social Reformer 
His long time association with Social Reform Movement, enabled him to render meritorious services to a magazine 'Social Reform', in addition to his works on the subject. Sriramulu also started a school in 1886 to help middle school English teacher when he lost his employment on false allegations. 

Devadasis dances were arranged during temple festivals and marriages. They were taking his help in learning the lyrics of javalis, padams, music and dance. They were seeking his permission and blessings to perform dances. He wrote these javalis and padams for them and also found a school of music in Eluru appointing teachers. 

He was participating in many literary social gatherings, taking his wife along with him, which was against the social customs during his time. He taught music to his daughter Saradamba, - a taboo in those days.  He allowed his daughter to give concerts also. His daughter’s education became hindrance to her wedding as per then social norms, even though he followed liberal practices in his son’s marriages. He did not follow meaningless social injunctions set in the name of tradition and customs. He wrote  ‘mundan khandana’ opposing the religious practice of shaving the heads of widows and started a monthly journal ‘analpa jalpita kalpavalli’ to propagate the correct views on traditions.

Personal life 
Sriramulu married Janakamma at the age of his 13. They had six sons and a daughter. They are - Kesava Rao, Narayana Rao, Madhava Rao, Govinda Rao, Vishnu Rao,  Madhusudhana Rao and daughter Saradamba, whom he taught Sanskrit and music. His second son Narayana Rao wrote 'Sri Sangitarasatarangini Anu Buddha Natakamu' left it in the middle of 3rd chapter and expired in 1905, which was later completed by Sriramulu. His fifth son Vishnu Rao wrote 'Dasuvari vamsa charitra (Family History) and Dasuvari vamsa vruksham (Family tree)'. Sriramulu educated his daughter Vemuri (Dasu) Saradamba. She learnt Telugu, Sanskrit, playing Veena (a musical instrument) at the very early age and began writing poems and also giving concerts in a far places like Mysore. She had  written Nagnajiti parinayam (a kavyam) and Madhava satakamu of 100 verses at the age of 11 years. She survived only for 19 years.

Legacy 
Sriramulu, died on May 16, 1908. Most of his works were lost. In this centenary year, an effort was made to restore his legacy. Mahakavi Dasu Sriramulu smaraka samithi had been undertaking the mission to resurrect this forgotten genius, who was hailed by scholars as ‘second Srinadha’ and restore on the pedestal that he richly deserves. Dasu Sriramulu's descendants formed Dasu Sriramulu Smaraka Samithi in 1973 in Hyderabad, India. The samiti retrieved and also published his works. A doctoral work on his musical compositions was done by his great grand daughter V. Vaidehi and the thesis was also published as book 'Mahakavi Dasu Sriramulu Gari Kruthulu Oka Sameeksha' in 2013.

Many public libraries and academies included his portrait in their gallery of greats for his service to music and theatre. Book release functions were organized by Samithi.   

To commemorate his 150th birthday, All India Radio broadcast a talk on Mahakavi “A multifaceted glory of Dasu Sriramulu”.  

To mark the death centenary of Srirama kavi, the department of culture had set the rolling long programmes for the year. `Sri Dasu Srirama Kavi Saraswata Vaibhavam' was organized on the last day of the `Sahiti Saptaham' of `Sataroopa' festival of the Department of Culture and State Cultural Council. Presiding over the function Dharmavarapu Subrahmanyam, the chairman suggested holding a `Dasu Sriramulu Day' every year and conduct seminars and programmes under the aegis of Cultural Council. Acharya Bethavolu Ramabrahmam,  Vakula Bharanam Ramakrishna, journalist Potturi Venkateswara Rao, Dwa.Na.Sastry etc. spoke on the versatile genius of Sriramalu.

Bibliography 
 Abhinava gadya prabandhamu (Written in 1893 and published in1974)
 Analpa Jalpitaa Kalpa Kalpa Vallee (Journal published in1880).
 Chakkatla danda  (Satakamu  published in1930 and 2nd edition in 1984) 
 Durachara Pisacha Bhanjani (3 booklets: were published together as a single book in 1991 - Durachara Pisacha Bhanjani (1890); Achara Nirukti (1890); and Vigraharadhana Taravali, a composition of 27 poems. Durachara Pisacha Bhanjani and  Achara Nirukti  were  written condemning the prevailing social evils. Vigraharadhana Taravali detailing the spiritual meaning of idol worship as a response to its critics.
 Krutulu, Padamulu, Jaavaleelu (2007) with notation. Sriramulu wrote several padams and javalis for devadasis, who were performing Bharatanatyam in temples. In 1991 a book was published  including only javalis and padams and released by  Sripada Pinakapani. Later the  comprehensive book was published in 2007 including  keertanas, swarajitis, tillanas, padams javalees and  magalaharatulu with notation provided by scholars in music and dance forms.
 Kuranga Gouri Shankara Natika (Play published in1981)
 Patitha Samasrli Prayaschitta Vishayakopanyasamu (1891)
 Prayavchitta nirnayamu (1867)
 Sri Andhra Devi Bhagavatham (First published in 1907, The  second edition of the book was published in 1928 and 3rd ed.in 1978). This is his magnum opus and Telugu translation of Devi Bhagavatham. Prior to him only 2 scholars translated this verse - Mulugu Papayaradhya (18th century poet) and Tirupati Venkata Kavulu in 1896. This work involving 6000 poems was completed  only in six months. Devi Bhagavatham, was widely read in homes, temples and religious gatherings.
 Sri Abhijnana Sakumtalamu (1898): This was the translated version of Sanskrit play of Kalidasa into Telugu by  Sriramulu. He translated this Sanskrit drama on the request of BA (undergraduate) students into Telugu language within 20 days.
 Sri Brungaraju Mahimamu, Shraddha Samshaya Vichedi (Written in 1906 and published in1989). This booklet was translated from Sanskrit, detailing  the characteristics of a medicinal plant namely  'Brungaraju' (Eclipta prostrata) Guntagalagura (in Telugu) and the preparation of Ayurvedic medicine. It was explained by Adinada Siddha to Navanada Siddhu.
 Sangitarasatarangini, anu Buddha Natakamu(1907)  This play was written by his second son Dasu Narayana Rao, who had left in the middle of 3rd chapter and deceased in 1905. Sriramulu completed the literary work in 1907. It is adopted from The Light of Asia by Edwin Arnold.
 Sri Surya Satakamu  (First published in 1902 and 2nd ed in 1979). This Satakamu of 100 verses originally written by Mayura kavi in Sanskrit, was  translated into Telugu by Sriramulu.
 Telugunadu (First published was in 1899. The 6th edition in 1974). Sriramulu began writing in 1892 to describe about various castes and sects in Telugu region.  In the first part, he wrote about Brahmin sects and could not complete the remaining.

Literary Works on Mahakavi 

 Bahumukha prajnasali Mahakavi Dasu Sriramulu (1975): The booklet was written by Dasu Atchuta Rao and published on the occasion of 1st Telugu World Conference, held in Hyderabad in 1975.
 Mahakavi Dasu Sriramulu Jayanthi Sanchika (A special issue published in April 1973) as a tribute to Sriramulu mahakavi on the occasion of his 100th birthday, compiling the articles written by other scholars.
 Mahakavi Dasu Sriramulu Gari Kruthulu Oka Sameeksha  (The doctoral thesis of V.Vaidehi on Dasu Sriramulu Kruthulu, which was Published as book in 2013)
 Complete story of genealogy of Dasu family, by Dasu Harinarayana. He compiled in 2018. 
The following literary works of Dasu Sriramulu are unavailable.

 Abhinaya Darpanamu (A treatise on music and dance)
 Abhinava Koumudi (A treatise on music and dance)
 Chilakulakoliki Satakamu (Satakamu, 100 verses)
 Gollapalli Raghunaadha Satakamu (1865- Satakamu 100 verses)
 Janaki Parinayam (Play of Rambadhra Dikshit - Translated from Sanskrit into Telugu). Serialized in a literary journal of his time –“Saraswati”.
 Kamakshi satakamu (Satakamu, 100 verses)
 Krishnarjuna Samaram (1861) Kavyam
 Lakshana vilasamu (Yakshaganamu) (1876, narrative of a romantic tiff between Krishna and Lakshana)
 Malatimadhveeyanatakamu,  (Play of Bhavabhuti - Translated from Sanskrit into Telugu in1900). It was also serialized in a literary journal of his time –“Manjulavani”.
 Malavikagnimitra natakamu (Play)
 Mahavira charitra natakamu (Play in1901)
 Manjari madhukareeyamu
 Manolakshmi vilasamu,  (Play in1890)
 Mudrarakshasa natakamu (Play in 1901)            
 Muddugumma Satakamu (Satakamu 1901)
 Namaskaravidhi Deepika (1897 to 1907)
 Noukayanamu
 Pancha Nrusimha Khetra mahatyamu leka Vedachala mahatyam (Kavyam in 1866)
 Paschatya vidya prasamsa
 Punarvivaha vicharana
 Ratnavali (Play)
 Satrajiti Vilasamu (Yakshaganamu,1860)
 Seetakalyana natakamu (Play)
 Somalingeswara satakam (1857)
 Sourasangrahaganitamu (1867)
 Tarka koumudi anu nyayabodha grandhamu (1899)
 Trimatamulu
 Uttararamayana charitra natakamu (Play)
 Vaisyadharma deepika (1896)
 Victoria dvatrinsati
 Yakshaganam Samvarnopakhyanamu (Yakshaganam)

References 

Telugu poets
Indian lawyers
Indian dramatists and playwrights
Telugu writers
20th-century Indian writers
19th-century Indian writers
Sanskrit–Telugu translators
1846 births
1908 deaths